Vian van der Watt (born 18 November 1992) is a South African professional rugby union player who most recently played with the . His regular position is scrum-half.

Rugby career

2008–2010 : Schoolboy rugby

Van der Watt was born in Springs. He was included in the Golden Lions squad for the Under-16 Grant Khomo Week in 2008 and was also named in a South Africa Under-16 Elite Squad in the same year. He was against selected by the Golden Lions for the Under-18 Academy Week in 2009 and the Craven Week in 2010.

2011–2013 : Golden Lions, UJ and South Africa Under-20

He made twelve starts for the  team during the 2011 Under-19 Provincial Championship, helping them finish in second position on the log to qualify for the title play-off semi-finals. Van der Watt scored five tries for his side during the regular season, the joint-third most by a Golden Lions player during the competition. The Golden Lions beat Western Province in the semi-finals and Gauteng rivals the Blue Bulls in the final to win the competition. In addition to his appearances in the Under-19 competition, Van der Watt also made two starts at Under-21 level, scoring a try against the s.

He was then included in the South Africa Under-20 squad for the 2012 IRB Junior World Championship being held in South Africa. He was named as a replacement for their first match against Ireland, which the hosts lost 19–23, but promoted to the starting line-up for their other two matches in Pool B; he scored a try in their 52–3 win over Italy before a 28–15 victory over England ensure South Africa's qualification to the semi-finals. Van der Watt remainder in the starting lineup for their 35–3 victory over Argentina in their semi-final clash, as well as for the final against New Zealand. Van der Watt's contribution in the final proved vital, as he scored a try seven minutes into the second half as South Africa won the match 22–16 to win the Junior World Championship for the first time in their history.

Van der Watt was a key player for the s in the 2012 Under-21 Provincial Championship, starting eleven of their matches and equalling his 2011 tally by scoring five tries – just Bradley Moolman scored more for the Lions – which included braces in matches against the s and the s. The team finished in fifth position, however, missing out on the title play-offs.

Van der Watt started the first leg of the play-off, helping the Lions to a 26–19 victory in Port Elizabeth. He didn't feature in the return leg, where the Lions ensured their return to Super Rugby despite an 18–23 defeat. He then made six appearances for the Golden Lions U21s in the 2013 Under-21 Provincial Championship, mainly being used as a replacement.

2014 : Leopards

He then linked up with the Potchefstroom-based  for the 2014 Currie Cup season. He made two appearances as a replacement in the qualification series, as the Leopards lost out on a spot in the Premier Division by a single point. He made a further two starts and two appearances as a replacement for the Leopards in the First Division.

2016 : Eastern Province Kings

Van der Watt's next taste of first class rugby came in 2016, when he was contracted to play for the  during the 2016 Currie Cup Premier Division. He made his debut in that competition on 31 August 2016, coming on as a second-half replacement in their match against  in Kimberley.

References

South African rugby union players
Living people
1992 births
People from Springs, Gauteng
Rugby union scrum-halves
Golden Lions players
Leopards (rugby union) players
South Africa Under-20 international rugby union players
Rugby union players from Gauteng